Cawood Bridge is a swing bridge which spans the Yorkshire River Ouse in North Yorkshire, England. Construction was authorised in 1870, with the formation of the Cawood Bridge bridge company. It was opened on 31 July 1872 to replace the ferry, and is located about halfway between Naburn and Selby. It is the only bridge from the village of Cawood that crosses the river. It is Grade II listed.

History
The local population at Cawood considered the ferry crossing to be slow and, sometimes even dangerous. The proposal for a bridge to replace the ferry crossing gained Royal Assent in 1870. The bridge was opened in July 1872 at a cost of £12,000.

Operations
CCTV cameras are installed to monitor traffic not adhering to the weight limit or red lights, and to allow officials to see traffic in both directions. It is the policy of the county council to prosecute any overweight vehicle, or vehicle jumping the red lights, caught on CCTV. Previous fines have been as much as £900. Crossing vehicles used to be charged a toll, but this system was scrapped in 1882, when the North Riding County Council bought the bridge.

The bridge has experienced numerous problems, due partly to its age, but mainly due to the increasing numbers of heavy goods vehicles and heavily laden farm vehicles using the bridge and causing damage, especially when they have loads in excess of the maximum gross weight (MGW). Issues have included the locking pin falling out of place, cracks forming in the supporting structure, and jamming of the swing mechanism, which has caused heavy traffic delays and tailbacks.

2003 closure
In October 2003, the bridge was closed for five days for urgent repair work, after a vehicle collided with a safety barrier.

Later inspection discovered that the York end of the bridge was about to fail due to three large cracks in one of the supporting steel plates, which ran the full length of the bridge. River traffic was halted, and new plates were fitted within hours, as a temporary measure.

Permanent repairs involved a steel plate, twice the thickness of the original, being fitted along the entire deck.

2015 floods 

In late December 2015, heavy rainfall led to flooding across large parts of northern England and Wales. The Ouse at Cawood flowed over the deck of the bridge.

References

Bridges in North Yorkshire
Bridges completed in 1872
Swing bridges in England
Bridges across the River Ouse, Yorkshire
Former toll bridges in England
Grade II listed bridges
Grade II listed buildings in North Yorkshire
Cawood